Stanko Arambašić (Levač in the village of Kolare, Ottoman Empire, today Serbia, 1764 - Smederevo, Ottoman Empire, 21 September 1798) was a Serbian Free Corps commander who liberated parts of Serbia during the Austro-Turkish War (1788-1791).

Biography
Stanko Arambašić was born in 1764, in Levač region in the village of Kolare (today the municipality of Jagodina) was the commander of a special Serbian National Army, also known as the Mustafa Pasha's Popular Army. in the service of the Ottoman Empire at a time when Janissary forces threatened to seize power. At the time of Mustafa Pasha Stanko was a Bimbaša in Mustafa's Popular Army
Later on, he was also one of the leaders of the Serbian Free Corps in the service of the Austrian imperial forces in the Austro-Turkish War (1788–1791). In "Monument of famous people in the Serbian people of recent times" by Milan Milićević states that Stanko was born in Veliko Selo, in the Belgrade district, although the footnote states that according to Vuk Karadžić he was born in Kolare in Levač. The data in Vuk Karadžić's book is a more reliable source for Stanko Arambašić, in fact, he was born in Kolare near Jagodina since the historian of the First Serbian Uprising, Lazar Arsenijević Batalaka also attests to that fact.

Stanko was of medium height, very handsome, and brave in combat. He was a volunteer in the Serbian Free Corps during the turbulent time of Kočina Krajina. During the rule of Hadji Mustafa Pasha in 1792 he became a bimbaša of a separate people's army in the service of the Ottoman Empire in the battle of Kolare, at the beginning of August 1793, he managed to prevent janissaries and the renegade of Osman Pazvantoğlu and place Belgrade Pashaluk under his administration. It was rumored that the special army he led numbered over 16,000 Serbs, mostly composed of Raja (meaning "common folk") and former Free Corps veterans. Of them, every fifty people had their Buljubaša, over a hundred there was a Harambaša and over a thousand Binbashi, same as the Turkish military ranks. Each soldier had to have two bags: one for laundry (two shirts, two underpants, and one pair of new shoes) and the other for food (bread and food). Each of the weapons had to have one musket (rifle), a scythe (knife), and two holsters (pistols), all in good condition.

In 1797, a military expedition of Husein Kučuk-Alija-Pasha failed to conquer Vidin or capture Osman Pazvantoğlu, so he and the Janissaries, at the end of November, tried again to annex the Smederevo Sandzak. The clashes took place in the vicinity of Veliko Selo, from where Stanko's army defended the Belgrade pashalik. After fierce fighting, the Janissaries were expelled from Belgrade and Pazvanoglu fled back to Vidin. The tactical members of the Sublime Porte soon realized that the stability of the Ottoman Empire was quite shaken and immediately took harsh measures against the Serbs who took part in the Austro-Turkish War, and many like Koča Anđelković and Rigas Feraios were killed after capture. Commander Stanko was also killed then. According to the report of Milan Đ. Milićević, the murder was committed on Saturday, 21 September 1798, in Belgrade, in a "small gypsy house" of "someone" called Gruja. The Serbs found Stanko's body the next day in Jezava and buried him in a village called Godomin, near Smederevo.

In 1799, the port was issued by Firman, who allowed the return of the Janissaries, and the Sultan Selim III forgave Pazvantoğlu's rebellion and appointed him Pasha.

See also
 Mihailo Mihaljević

References 

Serbian military leaders
1764 births
1798 deaths